The Concord Coalition is a political advocacy group in the United States, formed in 1992. A bipartisan organization, it was founded by U.S. Senator Warren Rudman, former Secretary of Commerce Peter George Peterson, and U.S. Senator Paul Tsongas. The Concord Coalition's advocacy centers on ending deficit spending and promoting a balanced budget in the U.S. federal government. The group's mission statement is to educate "the public about the causes and consequences of federal budget deficits, the long-term challenges facing America's unsustainable entitlement programs, and how to build a sound foundation for economic growth."

Former Senator Bob Kerrey was named a co-chair of the Concord Coalition in January 2002. Robert L. Bixby has been the Executive Director of the Concord Coalition since 1999.

Activities
Since 2006, the Concord Coalition has organized the Fiscal Wake-Up Tour, visiting cities to message to citizens and elected officials about the country's debt and fiscal future. Participants in the tour include representatives from The Brookings Institution, The Heritage Foundation, the Committee for Economic Development, the Progressive Policy Institute, and the American Enterprise Institute. Former Comptroller General of the United States David M. Walker serves as an advisor to the tour and participates in its public events.

The group's executive director, Robert Bixby, has noted that the federal deficit "is not some abstract issue in Washington" and that it "has real-world consequences for what's going to happen in state and local governments."

The Coalition's efforts to raise public awareness, with Bixby touring across the nation, plays a key role in the 2008 documentary film I.O.U.S.A.

Board of directors
Co-Chairman – Warren Rudman
Co-Chairman – Bob Kerrey
Co-Chairman – Paul Tsongas (1941–1997)
President – Peter G. Peterson
Secretary-Treasurer/Budget Chairman – Charles A. Bowsher
Finance Chairman – Eugene M. Freedman
Executive Director – Robert L. Bixby

See also 
 List of think tanks in the United States
 Balance of payments
 Citizens Against Government Waste
 Deficit hawk
 Fiscal conservatism
 Fiscal responsibility
 PAYGO
 United States federal budget
 National debt of the United States

References

External links
Concord Coalition Official website
Peter G. Peterson Foundation
Concord Coalition on Facebook
Concord Coalition on Twitter

1992 establishments in the United States
Economic advocacy groups in the United States
Nonpartisan organizations in the United States
Organizations established in 1992